The Malaysian blue flycatcher (Cyornis turcosus) is a species of bird in the family Muscicapidae. It is found in Brunei, Indonesia, Malaysia, and Thailand.

Its natural habitat is subtropical or tropical moist lowland forests. It is threatened by habitat loss.

References

Malaysian blue flycatcher
Birds of Malaysia
Malaysian blue flycatcher
Taxonomy articles created by Polbot